Attiko Metro is a Greek public company who is responsible for the development and construction of the Athens Metro and the Thessaloniki Metro, as well as the Athens Tram.

Headquartered in the Ellinoroson neighbourhood of Athens, the Greek government created Attiko Metro in July 1991: Attiko Metro's original purpose was to oversee the delivery of the Base Project of the Athens Metro, which opened in three stages, in 2000 and 2003. Attiko Metro also owned and operated the Athens Metro and Tram until June 2011, when STASY took over that role.

History 

Attiko Metro was created on 18 July 1991, under Law 1955/1991: The original purpose of Attiko Metro was to oversee the delivery of the Base Project of the Athens Metro, whose contract had been awarded to the Olympic Metro consortium of 23 companies in the previous month. The Greek government then assigned Attiko Metro the role of developing and build the Thessaloniki Metro in December 2003, and any future extensions to the Athens Tram in 2013.

Organisation 

The Greek government is currently the only shareholder of Attiko Metro. Law 1955/1991 allows the partial privatisation of Attiko Metro in the future, but the Greek government must retain a controlling interest of at least 51% over any resultant company: Attiko Metro may also only merge with mass transit organizations that operate within the area of the former Attica Prefecture.

Current operations 

Attiko Metro is currently responsible for the development and construction of the Athens Metro, the Thessaloniki Metro, and the Athens Tram.

Former operations 

Attiko Metro previously had two operational subsidiaries to operate and maintain the Metro  lines 2 and 3 and Tram network in Athens: on 17 June 2011, AMEL and Tram S.A. merged with Athens–Piraeus Electric Railways (ISAP) to form STASY, a subsidiary of Transport for Athens (OASA) instead of Attiko Metro:

Headquartered at the Sepolia Metro Depot at 94 Kifissou Avenue, AMEL was established on 15 February 2001, three years after Law 2669/1998 allowed Attiko Metro to operate and maintain Lines 2 and 3.
  Tram S.A. operated and maintained the infrastructure of the Athens Tram, including 35 Sirio trams and 48 stops (in June 2011). Headquartered at the tram depot in Elliniko, Tram S.A. was established in March 2001.

The logos of both companies were the same as the system that they operated.

Timeline of Athens Metro projects 

In this table, the completion date refers to the opening of the last section or station in the contract: for example, the initial scheme of the Athens Metro opened in three stages, on 28 January 2000, 15 November 2000, and 22 April 2003.

See also 

 Ministry of Infrastructure and Transport
 STASY

References 

Transport in Athens
Railway companies of Greece
Railway companies established in 1991
Rail transport in Attica
1991 establishments in Greece
Greek companies established in 1991